Arcadio Venturi (born 18 May 1929) is a retired Italian professional footballer who played as a midfielder.

Honours

International
 Represented Italy at the 1952 Summer Olympics.

Individual
 A.S. Roma Hall of Fame: 2016

References

1929 births
Living people
People from Vignola
Italian footballers
Italy international footballers
Serie A players
Serie B players
A.S. Roma players
Inter Milan players
Brescia Calcio players
Olympic footballers of Italy
Footballers at the 1952 Summer Olympics
Association football midfielders
Footballers from Emilia-Romagna
Sportspeople from the Province of Modena
Inter Milan non-playing staff
Juventus F.C. non-playing staff